The demography of France is monitored by the Institut national d'études démographiques (INED) and the Institut national de la statistique et des études économiques (INSEE). As of 1 January 2021, 65,250,000 people lived in Metropolitan France, while 2,785,000 lived in overseas France, for a total of 68,035,000 inhabitants in the French Republic.

In March 2017, the population of France officially reached the 67,000,000 mark. It had reached 66,000,000 in early 2014. Between the years 2010–17, the population of France grew from 64,613,000 to 66,991,000 (i.e. about 2.4 million people in a span of 7 years), making France one of the fastest-growing countries in Europe. The population of France is growing by 1,000,000 people every three years- an average annual increase of 340,000 people, or +0.6%.

France was historically Europe's most populous country. During the Middle Ages, more than one-quarter of Europe's total population was French; by the seventeenth century, this had decreased slightly to one-fifth. By the beginning of the twentieth century, other European countries, such as Germany and Russia, had caught up with France and overtaken it in number of people. However, the country's population sharply increased with the baby boom following World War II. According to INSEE, since 2004, 200,000 immigrants entered the country annually. One out of two was born in Europe and one in three in Africa. Between 2009 and 2012, the number of Europeans entering France increased sharply (plus 12% per year on average).

The national birth rate, after dropping for a time, began to rebound in the 1990s and currently the country's fertility rate is close to the replacement level. According to a 2006 INSEE study, "the natural increase is close to 300,000 people, a level that has not been reached in more than thirty years." With a total fertility rate of 1.83 in 2020, France however remains the most fertile country in the European Union.

Among the 802,000 babies born in metropolitan France in 2010, 80.1% had two French parents, 13.3% had one French parent, and 6.6% had two non-French parents.

Between 2006 and 2008, about 22% of newborns in France had at least one foreign-born grandparent (9% born in another European country, 8% born in the Maghreb and 2% born in another region of the world). Censuses on race and ethnic origin were banned by the French Government in 1978.

In 2021, the Total Fertility Rate of France was 1.82, and 7.7% was the percent of births to women that were their 4th+ child.

Historical overview

1800 to 20th century 

France was historically the largest nation in Europe. During the Middle Ages more than one quarter of Europe's population was French; by the 17th century it was still one fifth . Starting around 1800, the historical evolution of the population in France has been atypical in Europe. Unlike the rest of Europe, there was no strong population growth in France in the 19th and first half of the 20th century. The birth rate in France diminished much earlier than in the rest of Europe in part because inheritance laws dictated distribution of estates whereas in the UK wealth could be passed to the eldest son or child. The country's large population gave Napoleon a seemingly limitless supply of men for the Grande Armée, but the birth rate began to fall in the late 18th century; thus population growth was quite slow in the 19th century, and the nadir was reached in the first half of the 20th century when France, surrounded by the rapidly growing populations of Germany and the United Kingdom, had virtually zero growth. The slow growth of France's population in the 19th century was reflected in the country's very low emigration rate.

The French population only grew by 8.6% between 1871 and 1911, while Germany's grew by 60% and Britain's by 54%.

French concerns about the country's slow population growth began after its defeat in the Franco-Prussian War. For four years in the 1890s, the number of deaths exceeded the number of births. The National Alliance for the Growth of the French Population (ANAPF) was formed in 1896, and the Cognacq-Jay and other prizes were created for the parents of large families. Émile Zola's 1899 novel Fécondité is representative of contemporary concerns about the birthrate. France lost 10% of its active male population in World War I; the 1.3 million French deaths, along with even more births forgone by potential fathers being off at war, caused a drop of 3 million in the French population, and helped make Dénatalité a national obsession; by 1920 ANAPF had 40,000 members, and in July that year a new law strictly regulated abortion and contraception.

ANAPF proposed that parents of large families receive extra votes, and the belief that women's suffrage in other countries caused birth rates to decline helped defeat proposals before World War II to permit women to vote. The birth rate declined again after a brief baby boom from 1920 to 1923, and reached an all-time low during peacetime in the late 1930s. During the "hollow years" of the decade, the number of new conscripts declined because of the lack of births during World War I. From 1935 deaths exceeded births; the press widely discussed the country's decreasing population. Both left and right supported pro-natalist policies; even the French Communist Party ended its opposition to anti-birth control and anti-abortion laws in 1936, and its leader, Maurice Thorez, advocated for the "protection of family and childhood".

The Vichy government approved of the laws and implemented them as part of its Travail, famille, patrie national motto, as did the postwar Provisional Government of the French Republic. Also, France encouraged immigration, chiefly from other European countries such as Italy, Poland, and Spain. (In fact, with its low birth rate, stagnating or declining native-born population, and role as a destination for migrants from other parts of Europe, France's situation before World War II was not unlike that of Germany today.)

After World War II 

France experienced a baby boom after 1945; it reversed a long-term record of low birth rates. The government's pro-natalist policy of the 1930s do not explain this sudden recovery, which was often portrayed inside France as a "miracle". It was also atypical of the Western world: although there was a baby boom in other Western countries after the war, the baby boom in France was much stronger, and lasted longer than in most other Western countries (the United States was one of the few exceptions). In the 1950s and 1960s, France's population grew at 1% per year: the highest growth in the history of France, higher even than the high growth rates of the 18th or 19th century.

Since 1975, France's population growth rate has significantly diminished, but it still remains slightly higher than that of the rest of Europe, and much faster than at the end of the 19th century and during the first half of the 20th century. In the first decade of the third millennium, population growth in France was the highest in Europe, matched only by that of the Republic of Ireland, which has also historically undergone stagnant growth and even decline relative to the rest of Europe until recently. However, it is lower than that of the United States, largely because of the latter's higher net migration rate.

Historical summary
The following compares the past, present, and future size of the French population with other entities in Europe and in the world. All statements refer to France as understood in its modern borders; this pertains also to other countries. Historians suggest that France was the most populous state in Europe from at least the period of Charlemagne and the Frankish Empire, if not earlier, to the 19th century. Population statistics prior to the modern era are historical estimates as official counts were not made.

Until 1795 metropolitan France was the most populous country of Europe, ahead of Russia, and the fourth most populous country in the world, behind only China, India and Japan;
Between 1795 and 1866, metropolitan France was the second most populous country of Europe, behind Russia, and the fourth most populous country in the world, behind China, India and Russia (having become more populous than Japan during this period);
Between 1866 and 1909, metropolitan France was the third most populous country of Europe, behind Russia and Germany;
Between 1909 and 1933, metropolitan France was the fourth most populous country of Europe, behind Russia, Germany, and the United Kingdom;
between 1933 and 1991, metropolitan France was the fifth most populous country of Europe, behind Russia, Germany, the United Kingdom, and Italy;
Between 1991 and 2000, metropolitan France recovered its rank as the fourth most populous country of Europe, behind Russia, Germany, and the United Kingdom;
Since 2000, metropolitan France has recovered its rank as the third most populous country of Europe, behind Russia and Germany. Worldwide, France's ranking has fallen to twentieth most populous country;
In 2005 it was projected that if current demographic trends continued (i.e. declining population in Germany, and slightly rising population in France and the UK), around 2050 metropolitan France could again surpass the population of Germany, becoming the most populous state in the European Union. In contrast, 2009 UN projections say that the stronger-growing United Kingdom could be more populous than metropolitan France in 2050, leaving metropolitan France third amongst European nations, behind Russia and the UK.

In the above list, Turkey is not considered a European country. Turkey was less populous than metropolitan France until 1992 but is now more populous.

Population

Historical population figures
Demographic statistics according to the World Population Review in 2020.
One birth every 44 seconds
One death every 53 seconds
One net migrant every 11 minutes
Net gain of one person every 3 minutes

Demographic statistics according to the CIA World Factbook, unless otherwise indicated.

Please note:
figures are for metropolitan France only, not including overseas departments and territories, as former French colonies and protectorates. Algeria and its départements, although they were an integral part of metropolitan France until 1962, are not included in the figures.
to make comparisons easier, figures provided below are for the territory of metropolitan France within the borders of 2004. This was the real territory of France from 1860 to 1871, and again since 1919. Figures before 1860 have been adjusted to include Savoy and Nice, which only became part of France in 1860. Figures between 1795 and 1815 do not include the French départements in modern-day Belgium, Germany, the Netherlands, and Italy, although they were an integral part of France during that period. Figures between 1871 and 1919 have been adjusted to include Alsace and part of Lorraine, which both were at the time part of the German Empire.
figures before 1801 are modern estimates which do not include for the Roman Empire parts of Gaul that were in Germany, Belgium, the Netherlands and Luxembourg; figures from 1801 (included) onwards are based on the official French censuses.

Source:

Population growth over time 

Source: Louis Henry and Yves Blayo.

Life expectancy and mortality
Life expectancy in Metropolitan France from 1818 to 1950. Source: Our World In Data.

Death rate 9.6 deaths/1,000 population (2021 est.)

Age structure
Age structures of the France métropolitaine from the year 1740 to 2021. Source: Louis Henry and Yves Blayo.

Median age (2021 INSEE est.)

total: 41.1 years. Country comparison to the world: 40th
male: 39.6 years
female: 42.6 years

Sex ratio

at birth: 1.05 male(s)/female
0-14 years: 1.05 male(s)/female
15-24 years: 1.05 male(s)/female
25-54 years: 1.02 male(s)/female
55-64 years: 0.93 male(s)/female
65 years and over: 0.77 male(s)/female
total population: 0.96 male(s)/female (2020 est.))

 Dependency ratios

 total dependency ratio: 62.4
 youth dependency ratio: 28.7
 elderly dependency ratio: 33.7
 potential support ratio: 3 (2020 est.)

Fertility 

France has a high fertility rate compared to other European countries; this rate has increased after reaching a historic low in the early 1990s.px
 Total fertility rate: 2.01 children born per woman for metropolitan France and the overseas departments (in 2012), 2.00 for metropolitan France alone (in 2010).
 Mean age of women having their first birth: 29.9 years-old.

The table below gives the average number of children according to the place of birth of women. An immigrant woman is a woman who was born outside France and who did not have French citizenship at birth.

In 2021 there was 11.8 births/1,000 population. Total fertility rate (2020 data by INSEE) 1.83 children born/woman.

Mother's mean age at first birth

28.5 years (2015)

Total fertility rate in the 19th century 
The total fertility rate is the number of children born per woman. It is based on fairly good data for the entire period. Sources: Our World In Data and Gapminder Foundation.

Births by country of birth of the parents 
About 22% of newborns in France between 2006 and 2008 had at least one foreign-born grandparent (9% born in another European country, 8% born in the Maghreb and 2% born in another region of the world).

As of 2021, 31.4% of newborns in France had at least one foreign-born parent and 27.5% had at least one parent born outside of Europe (EU 28) (parents born in overseas territories are considered as born in France).

The table below gives the number of children born in metropolitan France according to the place of birth of both parents.

Births by citizenship of the parents 
As of 2021, 75.1% of newborns in France had two parents with French citizenship, 14.3% had one French parent, and 10.6% had two non-French parents.

The table below gives the number of children born in metropolitan France according to the citizenship of both parents.

Population projections 
The population of France is predicted to hit the 70 million mark between the year 2025/2030 and to overtake Germany's between 2050/2060, with 75.6 million French for 71 million Germans in 2060, while the UK is predicted to overtake France by 2030. By 2080, the population of France is estimated to reach 78.8 million (including the overseas departments, but not the overseas territories).

Figures from eurostat for metropolitan France and the overseas departments:

Source:

Vital statistics from 1900

The vital statistics below refer to France Métropolitaine and do not include the overseas departments, territories and New Caledonia.
For the purpose of compatibility, all data refers to Metropolitan France

Current vital statistics for Metropolitan France

Social issues

Marriage, divorce and family types 
In 2020, there was a total of 154,581 marriages in France.

Employment and income 
Unemployment, youth ages 15–24
total: 20.8%. Country comparison to the world: 61th
male: 21.4%
female: 20% (2018 est.)

Ethnic groups

Data collection 
Due to a law dating from 1872 at the start of the Third Republic, France has prohibited the collection of data on a citizens race, ethnicity or their beliefs such as religion through national censuses, however estimates have been made of the ethnic and racial demography of the country in the present.

Some organizations, such as the Representative Council of Black Associations of France (CRAN), have argued in favour of the introduction of data collection on minority groups but this has been resisted by other organizations and ruling politicians, often on the grounds that collecting such statistics goes against France's secular principles and harks back to Vichy-era identity documents. During the 2007 presidential election, however, Nicolas Sarkozy, polled on the issue, stated that he favoured the collection of data on ethnicity. Part of a parliamentary bill that would have permitted the collection of data for the purpose of measuring discrimination was rejected by the Conseil Constitutionnel in November 2007.

However, that law does not concern surveys and polls, which are free to ask those questions if they wish. The law also allows for an exception for public institutions such as the INED or the INSEE whose job it is to collect data on demographics, social trends and other related subjects, on condition that the collection of such data has been authorized by the National Commission for Computer-stocked data and Freedom (CNIL) and the National Council of Statistical Information (CNIS).

Statistics 
The modern ethnic French are the descendants of Celts, Iberians, Ligurians, Italic peoples (including Romans), and Greeks in southern France, later mixed with large groups of Germanic peoples arriving at the end of the Roman Empire such as the Franks, Burgundians, Alamanni, and Goths, Moors and Saracens in the south, and Scandinavians, Vikings, who became, by mixing with the local population, the Normans and settled mostly in Normandy in the 9th century.

In 2004, French conservative think-tank Institut Montaigne estimated that there were 51 million (85%) people of European ethnic origin, 6 million (10%) North African people, 2 million (3.5%) black people and 1 million (1.5%) people of Asian origin in Metropolitan France, including all generations of immigrant descendants. TIME magazine in 2009 estimated that there was an estimated range of 4 to 7 million Arabs, 3 to 5 million Blacks, 1.5 million Asians and around 600,000 Jewish people. Solis, a marketing company, estimated the numbers for ethnic minorities (immigrants and 2nd generation) in France in 2009 as 3.26 million Maghrebis (5.23%), 1.83 million black people (2.94%) (1.08 million Sub-Saharan Africans and 757,000 French from French West Indies), and 250,000 Turkish (0.71%).

In 2015, Michèle Tribalat released a paper estimating population of ethnic minorities in France in 2011 to constitute 30% if ancestry retracted to 3 generations but with age limit of 60.
15% were of other European origin and another 15% rest.

The scope of foreign origin can be estimated by the National Screening Program for Sickle Cell Disease because the genetic disease very rarely affects European people. Under government rules, newborn babies are screened when their backgrounds place them at risk of inheriting two copies of the sickle-cell gene, with the following criteria:
 Both parents are known to originate from a risk region.
 If the identity of one parent (i.e., the father) is unknown, the other (the mother) originates from a risk region.
 There is a family history of sickle-cell disease, regardless of the above.

The screening suggests that in 2000, 19 percent of all newborn babies in Metropolitan France had at least one parent originating from one of the risk regions. The figure for 2007 was 28.45 percent, for 2010 31.5 percent, for 2012 34.44 percent, for 2013 35.7 percent, and for 2015 38.9 percent. These percentages vary widely among French regions; for example, in 2015, screening suggested that only 8.1% of children born in Brittany had a parent originating from a sickle-cell risk region, while 73.4% of children born in Île-de-France (which includes Paris) did. The percentage for Île-de-France was a significant increase from 54.2% in 2007. However, a 2014 story in Le Monde suggested that the testing figures for Île-de-France were perhaps distorted by the practices of some hospitals in the region, which choose to test all babies whether or not they have parents with ancestry from an endemic sickle-cell region.

The Paris region is a magnet for immigrants, hosting one of the largest concentrations of immigrants in Europe. As of 2006, about 45% of people (6 million) living in the region were either immigrant (25%) or born to at least one immigrant parent (20%).

Of European ethnic groups not indigenous to France, the most numerous are people of Italian family origin and it is estimated that about 5 million citizens (8% of the population) are at least partly of Italian origin if their parentage is retraced over three generations. This is due to waves of Italian immigration, notably during the late 19th century and early 20th century. Other large European groups of non-native origin are Spaniards, Portuguese, Romanians, Poles, and Greeks. Also, due to more recent immigration, between five and six million people of Maghrebi origin and approximately 800,000 Turks inhabit France. An influx of 
Maghrebi Jews immigrated to France in the 1950s and after the Algerian War due to the decline of the French empire. Subsequent waves of immigration followed the Six-Day War, when some Moroccan and Tunisian Jews settled in France. Hence, by 1968, Maghrebi Jews were about 500,000 and the majority in France. As the majority of these new immigrants were already culturally French, because of their cooperation with colonists, they needed little time to adjust to French society. Black people come from both the French overseas territories (French Guiana, Guadeloupe, Martinique, Réunion, and former colony Haiti) and Sub-Saharan Africa (especially Cote d'Ivoire, Mali, and Senegal). France has the largest black population in Europe.

There is a substantial Romani population in France. There is approximately 400,000 Roma living in France.

Immigration

Since the 19th century, France has continued being a country of immigration. During the Trente Glorieuses (1946–1975), the country's reconstruction and steady economic growth led to the labor-immigration of the 1960s, when many employers found manpower in villages located in Southern Europe and North Africa. In 2008, the French national institute of statistics INSEE estimated that 11.8 million foreign-born immigrants and their direct descendants (second generation) lived in France representing 19% of the country's population. About 5.5 million are of European origin and 4 million of Maghrebi origin.Immigration to France exceeded 200,000 in recent years, as shown in table below.

Before World War II 
In the 20th century, France experienced a high rate of immigration from other countries. The immigration rate was particularly high during the 1920s and 1930s. France was the European country which suffered the most from World War I, with respect to the size of its population, losing 1.3 million young men out of a total population of 40 million. France was also at the time the European country with the lowest fertility rate, which meant that the country had a very hard time recovering from the heavy losses of the war. France had to open its doors to immigration, which was the only way to prevent population decline between the two world wars.

At the time, France was the only European country to permit mass immigration. The other major European powers, such as the UK or Germany, still had high fertility rates, so immigration was seen as unnecessary, and it was also undesirable to the vast majority of their populations. The majority of immigrants in the 1920s came from Italy and Poland, though from the 1930s, some also came from elsewhere in southern and eastern Europe, and the first wave of colonial French subjects from Africa and Asia. This mass immigration was ended and partially reversed by the economic problems of the 1930s. By the end of the Spanish Civil War, some half-million Spanish Republican refugees had crossed
the border into France.

Local populations often opposed immigrant manpower, leading to occasional outbursts of violence. The most violent was a pogrom against Italian workers who worked in the salt evaporation ponds of Peccais, erupted in Aigues-Mortes in 1893, killing at least nine and injuring hundreds on the Italian side.

After World War II 
After World War II, the French fertility rate rebounded considerably, as noted above, but economic growth in France was so high that new immigrants had to be brought into the country. Most immigrants were Portuguese as well as Arabs and Berbers from North Africa. The first wave arrived in the 1950s, but the major arrivals happened in the 1960s and 1970s. More than one million people from the Maghreb immigrated in the 1960s and early 1970s from North Africa, especially Algeria (following the end of French rule there) . One million European pieds noirs also migrated from Algeria in 1962 and the following years during the chaotic independence of Algeria. France has over three million French of Algerian descent, a small percentage of whom are third-or fourth-generation French.

French law facilitated the immigration of thousands of French settlers (colons in French language), ethnic or national French from former colonies of North and West Africa, India and Indochina, to mainland France. 1.6 million European pieds noirs settlers migrated from Algeria, Tunisia and Morocco. In the 1970s, over 30,000 French settlers left Cambodia during the Khmer Rouge regime as the Pol Pot government confiscated their farms and land properties. However, after the 1973 energy crisis, laws limiting immigration were passed. In addition, the country's birth rate dropped significantly during this time.

Between 1956 and 1967, about 235.000 Sephardic North African Jews from Algeria, Tunisia and Morocco also immigrated to France because of the decline of the French colonial empire and following the Six-Day War. Hence, by 1968, Sephardic North African Jews were the majority of the Jews in France. As the new immigrants were already culturally French, they needed little time to adjust to French society.

In the late 1970s, the end of high economic growth in France caused immigration policies to be considerably tightened, starting with laws by Charles Pasqua passed in 1986 and 1993. New immigrants were allowed only through the family reunion schemes (wives and children moving to France to live with husbands or fathers already living in France), or as asylum seekers. Illegal immigration thus developed as immigration policy became more rigid. In 2006, The French Ministry of the Interior estimated clandestine immigrants in France amounted to anywhere between 200,000 and 400,000 and expected between 80,000 and 100,000 people to enter the country illegally each year.

The Pasqua laws are a significant landmark in the shift in France's immigration policy through the course of the 20th century.
They are a sign of the securitization aspect of immigration, giving more power to the police, allowing them to perform random identity checks and deport immigrants without legal papers. The rise in anti-immigration sentiments was reinforced by a series of terrorist bombs in Paris in 1986, linked to Muslim immigrants in France.

Tightening immigration laws, as well as notions of "zero immigration", reflected national views that arose within the discussion around immigrant family reunification and national identity. Institut français des relations internationales
(IFRI) immigration expert, Christophe Bertossi, states that stigmatized as both a challenge to social cohesion and a "burden" for the French economy, family immigration is increasingly restricted and constructed as a racial issue. The "immigration choisie" policy strives consequently to select migrants according to their profile, skills and, still indirectly, origins.

Nonetheless, immigration rates in the 1980s and 1990s were much lower than in the 1960s and 1970s, especially compared to other European countries. The regions of emigrations also widened, with new immigrants now coming from sub-Saharan Africa and Asia. In the 1970s, a small but well-publicized wave of Chilean and Argentine political refugees from their countries' dictatorships found asylum in France.

Ethnic Vietnamese started to become a visible segment of society after the massive influx of refugees after the end of the Vietnam War in 1975. The expulsions of ethnic Chinese from Vietnam in the 1970s led to a wave of immigration and the settlement of the high-rise neighbourhood near the Porte d'Italie, where the Chinatown of Paris is located. Located in the 13th arrondissement, the area contains many ethnic Chinese inhabitants.

According to the distinguished French historian of immigration Gérard Noiriel, in 1989 one third of the population currently living in France was of "foreign" descent.

According to Michèle Tribalat, researcher at INED, there were, in 1999, approximately 14 million persons of foreign ancestry (about a quarter of the population), defined as either immigrants or people with at least one immigrant parent or grandparent. Half of them were of European ancestry (including 5.2 million from South Europe (Italy, Spain, Portugal and former Yugoslavia)). The rest were from Maghreb (3 million), Sub-Saharan Africa (680,000), Turkey (320,000) and other parts of the world (2.5 million). Immigrants from the Maghreb are commonly referred to as beur, a verlan slang term derived from the word arabe (French for Arab).

The large-scale immigration from Islamic countries has sparked controversy in France. Nevertherless, according to Justin Vaïsse, in spite of obstacles and spectacular failures like the riots in November 2005, in Parisian suburbs, where many immigrants live secluded from society with very few capabilities to live in better conditions, the integration of Muslim immigrants is happening as part of a background evolution and recent studies confirmed the results of their assimilation, showing that "North Africans seem to be characterized by a high degree of cultural integration reflected in a relatively high propensity to exogamy" with rates ranging from 20% to 50%. According to Emmanuel Todd, the relatively high exogamy among French Algerians can be explained by the colonial link between France and Algeria. One illustration of this growing resentment and job insecurity can be drawn from related events, such as the 2005 riots, which ensued in former President Chirac declaring a state of emergency. Massive demonstrations to express frustration over unemployment took place in March 2009. The importance of integration was brought to the forefront of the political agenda in Sarkozy's 2007 presidential campaign. Upon being elected, he symbolically created the French Ministry of Immigration, Integration, National Identity and Codevelopment. Integration is one of the pillars of its political aims.

Today 

In 2014, the National Institute of Statistics (INSEE is its acronym in French) published a study, according to which the numbers of Spanish, Portuguese and Italians in France had doubled between 2009 and 2012.

According to the French Institute, the increase resulting from the financial crisis that hit several European countries in that period, has pushed up the number of Europeans installed in France.
Statistics on Spanish immigrants in France show a growth of 107% between 2009 and 2012, from 5300 to 11,000 people.

Of 229,000 foreigners in France in 2012, nearly 8% were Portuguese, British 5%, Spanish 5%, Italians 4%, Germans 4%, Romanians 3%, Belgians 3% and Dutch 2%.

With the increase of Spanish, Portuguese and Italians in France, in 2012 46% of immigrants were European, while the percentage for African immigrants reached 30%, of which Moroccans were 7%, Algerians 7%, and Tunisians 3%. Meanwhile, 14% of all immigrants who settled in France in that year were from Asian countries: 3% from China, 2% from Turkey, 10% from America and Oceania, Americans and Brazilians accounting for 2% each.

As of 2008, the French national institute of statistics INSEE estimated that 11.8 million foreign-born immigrants and their direct descendants (limited to second-generation born in France) lived in France representing 19% of the country's population. More than 5.5 million are of European origin and about 4 million of Maghrebi origin (20% of Algerian origin and 15% of Moroccan or Tunisian origin). Immigrants aged 18 to 50 count for 2.7 million (10% of population age 18–50) and 5 million for all ages (8% of population). The second-generation immigrants aged 18 to 50 make up 3.1 million (12% of 18–50) and 6.5 million for all ages (11% of population). Without considering citizenship at birth, people not born in metropolitan France and their direct descendants made up 30% of the population aged 18–50 in metropolitan France as of 2008.

The region with the largest proportion of immigrants is the Île-de-France (Greater Paris), where 40% of immigrants live. Other important regions are Rhône-Alpes (Lyon) and Provence-Alpes-Côte d'Azur (Marseille). The most important individual countries of origin as of 2007 were Algeria (702,000), Morocco (645,000), Portugal (576,000), Italy (323,000), Spain (262,000) and Turkey (234,000). However, immigration from Asia (especially China), as well as from Sub-Saharan Africa (Senegal, Mali) is gaining in importance.

42% of the immigrants are from Africa (30% from Maghreb and 12% from Sub-Saharan Africa), 38% from Europe (mainly from Portugal, Italy and Spain), 14% from Asia and 5% from America and Oceania. Outside Europe and North Africa, the highest rate of immigration is from Vietnam, Cambodia and Senegal.

The following table shows immigrants and second-generation immigrants by origin as of 2008 according to a study published by Insee in 2012. Third-generation immigrants, illegal immigrants, as well as ethnic minorities like black people from the French overseas territories residing in metropolitan France (800,000), Roms (500,000) or people born in Maghreb with French citizenship at birth (1 million Maghrebi Jews, Harkis and Pied-Noir) and their descendants, who are French by birth and not considered as immigrants or immigrant descendants, are not taken into account.

Net migration rate 1.06 migrant(s)/1,000 population (2021 est.) Country comparison to the world: 61th 
 

Immigrants by country of birth as of 2021:https://www.statista.com/statistics/944172/geographical-origins-of-immigrants-france/

In 2004, a total of 140,033 people immigrated to France. Of them, 90,250 were from Africa and 13,710 from Europe. In 2005, immigration levels fell slightly to 135,890. The European Union allows free movement between the member states. While the UK (along with Ireland and Sweden and non-EU members Norway and Switzerland) did not impose restrictions, France put in place controls to curb Eastern European migration.

As at 1 January 2006, INSEE estimated that the number of foreigners living in metropolitan France amounted to 3.5 million people. Two out of five foreigners are from Portugal, Algeria or Morocco. Thus, EU nationals immigrating to France comprise 1.2 million people, and 1.1 million people are from the three Maghreb countries of Morocco, Algeria and Tunisia. Immigrants are concentrated in Île-de-France, Rhone-Alpes, Provence and Côte d'Azur regions, accounting for 60% of the total immigrant population. Furthermore, there appears to be a lower rate of immigrants arriving from the EU since 1975 as opposed to an increase in African immigrants.

In the first decade of the 21st century, the net migration rate was estimated to be 0.66 migrants per 1,000 population a year. This is a very low rate of immigration compared to other European countries, the United States or Canada. Since the beginning of the 1990s, France has been attempting to curb immigration, first with the Pasqua laws, followed by both right-wing and socialist-issued laws. This trend is also demonstrated in anti-immigrant sentiments among the public. For example, the Pew Research Center in Washington, D.C. conducted a public opinion poll in February 2004 among French nationals. This poll measured the extent of support for restricting immigration among French nationals, by age cohort. 24% of individuals 18 to 29 were restricting immigration, with 33% of individuals 30 to 49 and 53% for both 50 to 64 and 65 and over. Nearly nine years later, a January 2013 poll conducted in France by Ipsos found that 70% of respondents said that there were "too many immigrants in France".

The immigration rate is currently lower than in other European countries such as United Kingdom and Spain; however, some say it is unlikely that the policies in themselves account for such a change. Again, as in the 1920s and 1930s, France stands in contrast with the rest of Europe. Back in the 1920s and 1930s, when other European countries had a high fertility rate, France had a low fertility rate and opened its doors to immigration to avoid a population decline. Today, it is the rest of Europe that has very low fertility rates, and countries like Germany or Spain avoid population decline only through immigration. In France, however, the fertility rate is still fairly high for European standards. It is, in fact, the highest in Europe after Ireland (the EU) and Albania (perhaps higher than Ireland's) and so most population growth is due to natural increase, unlike in the other European countries.

The difference in immigration trends is also because the labour market in France is currently less dynamic than in other countries such as the UK, Ireland or Spain. One reason for this could be France's relatively high unemployment, which the country has struggled to reduce for the past two decades. There is also a parallel dynamic between immigration and unemployment. Immigrants tend to be subjected to higher rates of unemployment. In 2008, the immigrant unemployment rate in France was a startling 13%, twice as high as for the national population (6%). One can further analyse the trend in relation to education. In the ministry's 2010 report on professional inclusion for immigrants, 19.6% of immigrants without any education were unemployed while 16.1% of immigrants who had graduated high school were unemployed. Only 11.4% of immigrants with an undergraduate degree or higher were unemployed.

For example, according to the UK Office for National Statistics, between July 2001 and July 2004, the population of the UK increased by 721,500 inhabitants, of which 242,800 (34%) was due to natural increase, 478,500 (66%) to immigration. According to the INSEE, between January 2001 and January 2004 the population of Metropolitan France increased by 1,057,000 inhabitants of which 678,000 (64%) was due to natural increase, 379,500 (36%) from immigration.

The latest 2008 demographic statistics have been released, and France's birth and fertility rates have continued to rise. The fertility rate increased to 2.01 in 2012 and, for the first time, surpasses the fertility rate of the United States.

North and South Americans in France
Americans total more than 100,000 permanent residents in France, Canadians 11,931, followed by Latin Americans, are a growing subgroup, the most numerous of which are Brazilians, at 44,622; followed by Colombians, at 40,000, Venezuelans, at 30,000; Peruvians, at 22,002; Argentineans, at 11,899; and Chileans, 15,782.

Europeans in France
In 2014 The National Institute of Statistics (INSEE, for its acronym in French) published a study, according to which has doubled the number of Spanish immigrants, Portuguese and Italians in France between 2009 and 2012.

According to the French Institute, the increase resulting from the financial crisis that hit several European countries in that period, has pushed up the number of Europeans installed in France.
Statistics on Spanish immigrants in France show a growth of 107 percent between 2009 and 2012, i.e. in this period went from 5300 to 11,000 people.

Of the total of 229,000 foreigners in France in 2012, nearly 8% were Portuguese, British 5%, Spanish 5%, Italians 4%, Germans 4%, Romanians 3%, 3% Belgians.

With the increase of Spanish, Portuguese and Italian in France, the weight of European immigrants arrived in 2012 to 46 percent, while this percentage for African reached 30%, with a presence in Morocco (7%), Algeria (7%) and Tunisia (3%).

Meanwhile, 14% of all immigrants who settled in France that year were from Asian countries: 3% of China and 2% in Turkey, while in America and Oceania constitute 10% of Americans and Brazilians accounted for higher percentage, 2% each.

Maghrebis in France
People of Maghrebi origin form the largest ethnic group in the country after those of European origin.

According to Michèle Tribalat, a researcher at INED, there were 3.5 million people of Maghrebi origin (with at least one grandparent from Algeria, Morocco or Tunisia) living in France in 2005 corresponding to 5.8% of the total French metropolitan population (60.7 million in 2005). Maghrebis have settled mainly in the industrial regions in France, especially in the Paris region. Many famous French people like Edith Piaf, Isabelle Adjani, Arnaud Montebourg, Alain Bashung, Dany Boon and many others have Maghrebi ancestry.

Below is a table of population of Maghrebi origin in France, numbers are in thousands:

In 2005, the percentage of young people under 18 of Maghrebi origin (at least one immigrant parent) was about 7% in Metropolitan France, 12% in Greater Paris and above 20% in French département of Seine-Saint-Denis.

According to other sources, between 5 and 6 million people of Maghrebin origin live in France corresponding to about 7–9% of the total French metropolitan population.

Immigration policy
As mentioned above, the French Ministry of Immigration, Integration, National Identity and Codevelopment was created immediately following the appointment of Nicolas Sarkozy as president of France in 2007. Immigration has been a relevant political dimension in France's agenda in recent years. Sarkozy's agenda has sharpened the focus placed on integration of immigrants living in France as well as their acquisition of national identity. The state of immigration policy in France is fourfold. Its pillars of immigration policy are to regulate migratory flows in and out of France, facilitate immigrants' integration and promote French identity, honor the French tradition's principle of welcoming political asylum and promote solidarity within the immigrant population (principle of co-development). In its 2010 Budget report, the Ministry of Immigration declared it would fund €600 million for its immigration policy objectives, a figure representing 60 million more than in 2009 (otherwise an 11.5% increase from 2009 figures).

In July 2006, President Sarkozy put into effect a law on immigration based upon the notion of "chosen immigration", which allows immigration into France to a restricted field of employment sectors, notably the hotel and restaurant industries, construction and seasonal employment. The following summer of 2007, Sarkozy amended the law to require the acquisition of the French language as a pre-condition. According to Christophe Bertossi, immigration expert in France's Institut français des relations internationales (IFRI), "there is a dominant trend in the French policy to stem family migration, notably conditioned after the 2007 law by a minimum level of French language tested and by the demonstration that he/she endorses the main French constitutional principles".

France, along with other EU countries, have still not signed their agreement to the United Nations Convention on the Protection of the Rights of All Migrant Workers and Members of Their Families of 1990. This convention is a treaty to protect migrant workers' rights, in recognition of their human rights.

Alternative policies have been discussed in formulating immigration policy, such as a quota system. At the beginning of 2008, as the government was rethinking its orientation on immigration policy with the creation of the new ministry, the idea of a quota system was introduced as a possible alternative. In early 2008, a proposal was made to Parliament to decide each year how many immigrants to accept, based on skill and origin. However, this quota policy contradicts the French Constitution. A commission was formed in February 2008 to study how the Constitution could be changed to allow for a quota system. The main difficulty is the origin principle of establishing a quota "constituting a breach in the universalistic ideology of the French Republic".

On 18 January 2008, the government published a list of 150 job titles that were encountering difficult supply of labour. Most immigrants living in France today are reported to cover the following sectors: agriculture, service to persons in need (childcare, the elderly), construction, education, health and services to businesses. Thus, the government is seeking to match immigrants with the economic makeup of France. The current administration could also seek to integrate migrants and their families through education and training, making them more competitive in the job market. To tackle critical labour shortages, France also decided to participate in the EU Blue Card.

Therefore, the outlook towards immigrants in France is shifting as unemployment continues to dominate the political agenda, along with political incentives to strengthen French national identity. Recent incidents, such as the 2005 civil unrest and Romani repatriation have shed light on France's immigration policies and how these are viewed globally, especially in congruence or discontinuity with the EU. A longitudinal study has been conducted since March 2010 to provide qualitative research regarding the integration of new immigrants. The report is being finalized at the end of December 2010 and will be most relevant to provide insight into further immigration policy analysis for the French government.

Languages

French is the only official language of France, and is constitutionally required to be the language of government and administration. There is a rising cultural awareness of the regional languages of France, which enjoy no official status. These regional languages include the Langue d'oïl, Langue d'oc, Romance languages other than French, Basque, Breton and Germanic languages. Immigrant groups from former French colonies and elsewhere have also brought their own languages.

Religion

France has not collected religious or ethnic data in its censuses since the beginning of the Third Republic, but the country's predominant faith has been Roman Catholicism since the early Middle Ages. Church attendance is fairly low, however, and the proportion of the population that is not religious has grown over the past century. A 2004 IFOP survey tallied that 44% of the French people did not believe in God; contrasted to 20% in 1947. A study by the CSA Institute conducted in 2003 with a sample of 18,000 people found that 65.3% considered themselves Roman Catholic, while 27% considered themselves atheists, and 12.7% (8,065,000 people) belonged to a religion other than Catholicism.

In the early 21st century there were an estimated 5 million Muslims in France, one million Protestants, 600,000 Buddhists, 491,000 Jews, and 150,000 Orthodox Christians. The US State Department's International Religious Freedom Report 2004 estimated the French Hindu population at 181,312. These studies did not ask the respondents if they were practicing or how often they did practice if they were active in the laity.

According to a poll conducted in 2001 for French Catholic magazine La Croix, 69% of respondents were Roman Catholic, 22% agnostic or atheist, 2% Protestant (Calvinist, Lutheran, Anglican and Evangelical), and 7% belonged to other religions.

According to a 2015 estimate of CIA World Factbook the numbers are: Christian (overwhelmingly Roman Catholic) 63-66%, Muslim 7-9%, Jewish 0.5-0.75%, Buddhist 0.5-0.75%, other 0.5-1.0%, none 23-28%.

List of France's largest aires urbaines (metropolitan areas)
The following is a list of the twenty largest aires urbaines (metropolitan areas) in France, based on their population at the 2015 census. Population at the 2006 census is indicated for comparison.

Between 2006 and 2011, Toulouse, Rennes, Montpellier, Nantes, Bordeaux and Lyon had the fastest-growing metropolitan areas in France.

 Urbanization

 urban population: 81% of total population (2020)
 rate of urbanization: 0.72% annual rate of change (2015-20 est.)

See also
French people – officially a nationality, also discusses overseas French descendants.
List of French people of immigrant origin
List of French people
Racism in France
List of fifteen largest French metropolitan areas by population
INSEE code
Pied-noirs, the name for French settlers in Algeria
Caldoches
Population of Paris
Jews in France
French immigration to Puerto Rico
French Portuguese
French Canadian
French American
Franco-Mauritian
Roma in France

Notes

References

Further reading
 Diebolt, Claude, and Perrin Faustine. Understanding Demographic Transitions. An Overview of French Historical Statistics (Springer, 2016) 176 pages. table of contents
 Dyer, Colin L. Population and Society in 20th Century France (1978)
 Henry, Louis. "The population of France in the eighteenth century." in Population in History (1965). pp 441+
 Spengler, Joseph J. France Faces Depopulation (1938)
 Van de Walle, Etienne. The female population of France in the nineteenth century: a reconstruction of 82 départements (Princeton University Press, 1974)

External links

 Inflow of third-country nationals by country of nationality, by year
  Audio book (mp3) – Introduction and first chapter of Éric Maurin's book Le ghetto français, enquête sur le séparatisme social
  Population of French communes with more than 2,000 inhabitants
  Une question de la seconde génération en France – Le rôle de l'école dans la formation d'une identité minoritaire, par Patrick Simon
 France opens first museum dedicated to the history of immigration – Networkeurope.org
 Population cartogram of France
 Immigration expert Mr. Patrick Weil, has written extensively on the topic and is a well-respected intellectual voice in France.
 French immigration motives in numbers, INSEE
 Ministerial webpage
 Population statistics, INSEE webpage
 Organization for Economic Cooperation and Development Migration office
 Official migration reports, immigration.gouv.fr
 Expatriates in France, linkexpats.com

 
Institut national de la statistique et des études économiques